Cape Lachman is a cape marking the northern tip of James Ross Island, which lies south of Trinity Peninsula, Antarctica. It was discovered by the Swedish Antarctic Expedition, 1901–04, under Otto Nordenskiöld, who named it for J. Lachman, a patron of the expedition.

References

Headlands of James Ross Island